Emigrant Valley is a valley in the U.S. state of Nevada.

Emigrant Valley was named for a party of emigrants who traveled through it. The valley is home to the Groom Lake Facility of the Nevada Test Range, popularly known as Area 51.

References

Valleys of Lincoln County, Nevada